Brackenridge can refer to:

Places
 Brackenridge, Pennsylvania
 Brackenridge Park, in San Antonio, Texas
 Brackenridge Park Golf Course, in San Antonio, Texas

Other uses
 Brackenridge (surname)
 A University of Pittsburgh residence hall, Brackenridge Hall
 University Medical Center Brackenridge, a hospital in Austin, Texas
 Brackenridge Works, an Allegheny Technologies steel mill in Brackenridge, Pennsylvania

See also
 
 Bracken Ridge, Queensland, Australia
 Breckenridge (disambiguation)
 Breckinridge (disambiguation)